Voyager is the debut album by Space Needle, released in 1995.

Critical reception
The Orlando Sentinel called the album "mysterious, often combining lo-fi sound and mock-futuristic sound effects." Guitar Player wrote that Space Needle "shoots into the astral realm with billowing feedback clusters, pulsating noise dementia, and scattershot drum grooves—like Hendrix playing the 'Star-Spangled Banner' in a Long Island basement."

Paste listed Voyager as the ninth best indie rock album of 1995.

Track listing
 "Eyes To The World" 3:40
 ""Dreams"" 2:03
 "Put It On The Glass" 2:49
 "Beers In Heaven" 4:55
 "Patrick Ewing" 3:49
 "Starry Eyes" 4:56
 "Before I Lose My Style" 5:42
 "Scientific Mapp/Junky's Fingers/Callwood's Lament" 13:47

Personnel
Jud Ehrbar - drums, vocals, keyboards, guitars, percussion
Jeff Gatland -  guitars, percussion

References

1995 debut albums
Space Needle (band) albums